You Don't Have to Die is a 1988 American short documentary film about a young boy (Jason Gaes) and his successful battle against cancer, directed by Malcolm Clarke and Bill Guttentag.

Production
Some scenes were animated by John Canemaker.

Accolades
In 1989, it won an Oscar for Documentary Short Subject at the 61st Academy Awards.

Cast
 Jason Gaes as himself
 Adam Gaes as himself
 Craig Gaes as himself
 Geralyn Gaes as herself
 Melissa Gaes as herself
 Tim Gaes as himself

References

External links

, posted by John Canemaker

1988 films
1988 short films
1988 documentary films
1988 independent films
1980s short documentary films
American short documentary films
Best Documentary Short Subject Academy Award winners
American independent films
Films directed by Bill Guttentag
Documentary films about cancer
Documentary films about children
1980s English-language films
1980s American films